Cardiacs and Affectionate Friends is a compilation album published by Org Records, the record label associated with the Organ fanzine. It collects recent songs by Cardiacs and associated projects featuring Tim Smith, including Spratleys Japs, the Sea Nymphs and OceanLandWorld (1995). Other acts include Mikrokosmos (Bic Hayes), Catherine in a Cupboard (Bob Leith and Jim Smith), Lake of Puppies (Willliam D. Drake) and solo tracks by Drake, Mark Cawthra and Jon Poole. It was also released on All My Eye and Betty Martin Music.

Track listing

Personnel
Adapted from the Cardiacs and Affectionate Friends liner notes.

Tim Smith – compilation
Marina Anthony – artwork

Notes

References

Cardiacs compilation albums
2001 compilation albums